Idhayakkani is a 1975 Indian Tamil-language action thriller film directed by A. Jagannathan and produced by R. M. Veerappan, starring M. G. Ramachandran in the lead role, with Pandari Bai, R. S. Manohar and Radha Saluja among others enacting supporting roles. The film was the highest-grossing Tamil film of the year, running for 150 days in theatres. It was the only Indian film to be screened at the Tashkent International Film Festival in 1978.

Plot 
Mohan is a kind-hearted man whose theory of life is equality. He puts it into practice by sharing equally the income of his estate with his labourers. He has another passion – he wants to serve the country – and for that, he has joined the police force as an officer. He meets a needy, innocent, uneducated, village girl, Lakshmi, and on the advice of an elderly domestic help, he permits her to stay in his house. 

Tongues start wagging, rumors spread and to remove the stigma now associated with her name, Mohan decides to marry the girl with her and his mother's consent. He joins duty. However, his happiness is short-lived. He is surprised when he discovers his wife's photo in the file of the case he is assigned to investigate which involves the murder of a leading scientist, as the main suspect. He is shocked but decides to do his duty and begins to investigate by first checking if his wife is really as innocent as she looks. He then takes the battle to other side by infiltrating the gang and in the end, finds the truth.

Cast 
 M. G. Ramachandran as Mohan (Red)
 Radha Saluja as Lakshmi, alias Mala
 Manohar as Albert
 Thengai Srinivasan as Rangarajan (Julie)
 C. R. Parthiban as Inspector
 K. Kannan as Kannan
 V. Gopalakrishnan as Madhavarao
 S. V. Ramdas as Dass, a hired man
 Isari Velan as Isari, Mohan's personal secretary
 Vennira Aadai Nirmala as a female singer in Hello lover', Thotta idam
 Pandari Bai as Mohan's mother
 Rajasulochana as Lily
 Shanmugasundari as Mohan's relative
 Shamugasundaram as Nattamai's son
 Karikol Raju as Panchayat leader
 Peeli Sivam as Hotel manager
 Usilai Mani as Astrologer
 Ennatha Kannaiya as Tour guide
 T. K. S. Natarajan as Iyer
 Trichy Soundararajan as C.I.D officer

Guest appearances

 S. V. Subbaiah as Ponnuswamy
 P. S. Veerappa as Uncle John
 V. S. Raghavan as The judge
 Shakti Prasad as Dharma Prakash, an atomic power scientist
 Rathna as Kamala, a picker from Mohan's Sathiya Coffee Estate Mohan, Neega Nallairukkanu

Production 
Idhayakkani is the debut of Bollywood actress Radha Saluja in Tamil.

Soundtrack 
The music was composed by M. S. Viswanathan. The songs "Inbame Undhan Per", "Neenga Nalla Irukkanum" became chartbusters. Vijay Antony remixed the former song for the film Mariyadhai (2009).

Release and reception 
Idhayakkani was released on 22 August 1975. Ananda Vikatan praised the film for depicting Mercara's greenery and the horror of the Pichavaram backwaters, along with the music and colour cinematography. Kanthan of Kalki praised the writing by Veerappan, and the direction of Jagannathan. The film became a major success, and a breakthrough for Jagannathan.

References

External links 

1970s action thriller films
1970s Tamil-language films
1975 films
Fictional portrayals of the Tamil Nadu Police
Films directed by A. Jagannathan
Films scored by M. S. Viswanathan
Indian action thriller films